List of speakers of the Niue Assembly.

This is a list of speakers of the Niue Assembly:

Sources

Politics of Niue
Niue